Susan Essman (born May 31, 1955) is an American stand-up comedian, actress, writer and television producer, best known for her role as Susie Greene on Curb Your Enthusiasm, Bobbi Wexler on Broad City, and the voice of Mittens in Bolt.

Early life
Essman was born on May 31, 1955 in The Bronx, New York City, and was raised in the suburb of Mount Vernon. Her father, Leonard Essman, was an internist and clinical oncologist. Her mother, Zora (née Pressman), taught Russian at Sarah Lawrence College. She is the great granddaughter of silent film actor and Russian opera impresario Leo Feodoroff. Essman is Jewish; her grandparents emigrated from Russia and Poland. She received her bachelor's degree from SUNY Purchase College.

Career

Performing
Essman has been traveling and appearing at clubs throughout the country for more than three decades. In 1988, she appeared on HBO with Joy Behar and other rising female comedians on On Location: Women of the Night II. On January 5, 1989, she was a guest on The Tonight Show with Johnny Carson. Her first half-hour special premiered on September 20, 1992 on HBO’s One Night Stand. As much of her comedy draws from her ethnic background, she has been featured in such documentaries as, Heroes of Jewish Comedy and A History of Jewish Comedy.

Essman made her U.K. standup comedy debut at the Corn Exchange at the Newbury Comedy Festival in July 2007. While in England, she appeared on the British television show 8 Out of 10 Cats.

Essman began her acting career with small parts in two 1988 films – Crocodile Dundee II and Punchline – but is best known for her role as Susie Greene, the wife of Jeff Greene (portrayed by Jeff Garlin), on the HBO comedy series Curb Your Enthusiasm. Essman told The New York Times that, by the show's third season, she could not "walk down the street anymore without people stopping her and begging her to say [her character's catchphrase] 'You fat fuck'". In 2007, Slate named Essman's character one of the best on television, and a reason the publication looked forward to the return of the show.

She also provided the voice of Helen Higgins on the Comedy Central series Crank Yankers; she was an occasional correspondent on the first season of the network's The Daily Show. She appeared on Comedy Central's Roast of Bob Saget on August 17, 2008 and provided the voice of "Mittens" (the cat) in the 2008 Disney animated film, Bolt, and later reprised the role in the 2009 short Super Rhino, released on the film's home media. She also made an appearance on the Regis Philbin version of Million Dollar Password.

Writing
Essman's book, What Would Susie Say: Bullshit Wisdom About Love, Life and Comedy, was published in October 2009 by Simon & Schuster.

Personal life
Essman was diagnosed with celiac disease in 2002 and used to be a pescatarian—"Not a moral thing," she explains, but "aesthetic"; chicken "grosses me out"—and "lives on sushi". She married Jim Harder, a commercial real estate broker, in September 2008. She owns a Shih Tzu named Popeye.

Essman is a good friend of Joy Behar, and has appeared on The View multiple times. In 2009, Behar hosted an event at the 92Y with Essman as a guest.

Filmography

Film

Television

Awards and nominations

References

External links
 

Living people
Actresses from New York (state)
American stand-up comedians
21st-century American women writers
Television producers from New York City
American women television producers
American film actresses
American television actresses
American voice actresses
Jewish American actresses
Jewish American female comedians
Jewish American writers
Writers from Mount Vernon, New York
State University of New York at Purchase alumni
American women comedians
People from the Bronx
20th-century American comedians
21st-century American comedians
20th-century American actresses
21st-century American actresses
Comedians from New York (state)
American people of Russian-Jewish descent
American people of Polish-Jewish descent
Jewish women writers
Actors from Mount Vernon, New York
21st-century American Jews
Year of birth missing (living people)